Craig Marlon Bingham (born September 26, 1959) is a former American football linebacker who played five seasons in  the NFL with the Pittsburgh Steelers and the San Diego Chargers. He is distinguished as being the first Jamaican to play in the National Football League.

Early life
Bingham  was born in Kingston, Jamaica and attended Stamford High School in Stamford, Connecticut.

He   matriculated at Syracuse University.  His college teammates included future Hall of Famer Art Monk as well as several other future NFL players: Gary Anderson, Joe Morris, Jim Collins, Craig Wolfley, Andrew Gissinger and Bill Hurley.

Football  career
Bingham was selected by the Pittsburgh Steelers in the sixth round of the 1982 NFL Draft.  Over the first two seasons of his career he was used primarily as a special teams player by the Steelers.  Early in the 1983 season he suffered a knee injury which was significantly exacerbated in a playoff loss to the Oakland Raiders.  The injury was initially thought to be career-ending, but after three surgeries and significant rehab, Bingham was back in time for the 1984 season.

Bingham got his first chance to start in week 14 of the 1984 season against the Houston Oilers due to an injury to Bryan Hinkle.  That would turn out to be the only non-strike start of his career.

Bingham was released by the Steelers in September 1985.  He was among the team's final cuts in training camp.  He was picked up by the San Diego Chargers with whom he was active for eight games in 1985.

Bingham finished his professional career as a replacement player for the Steelers during the 1987 NFL players strike.  He started in all three replacement games, but was once again released once the strike was settled.

References

1959 births
Living people
Sportspeople from Kingston, Jamaica
Jamaican players of American football
American football linebackers
Syracuse Orange football players
Pittsburgh Steelers players
San Diego Chargers players
National Football League replacement players
Stamford High School (Stamford, Connecticut) alumni